Schlafen family member 12 like is a protein that in humans is encoded by the SLFN12L gene.

References

Further reading